The Americas Zone was one of the three regional zones of the 1981 Davis Cup.

8 teams entered the Americas Zone in total, split across the North & Central America and South America Zones. With the introduction of a new tiered format, the previous year's sub-zonal finalists bypassed Zonal competition and qualified directly for the new 16-team World Group. The remaining teams would now compete for a place in the following year's World Group. The winner of each sub-zone advanced to the Americas Inter-Zonal Final to compete for one place in next year's World Group.

Chile defeated Colombia in the Americas Inter-Zonal Final and qualified for the 1982 World Group.

Participating nations
North & Central America Zone: 

South America Zone:

North & Central America Zone

Draw

Semifinals

Colombia vs. Canada

Venezuela vs. Caribbean/West Indies

Final

Colombia vs. Venezuela

South America Zone

Draw

Semifinals

Peru vs. Chile

Ecuador vs. Uruguay

Final

Chile vs. Uruguay

Americas Inter-Zonal Final

Colombia vs. Chile

References

External links
Davis Cup official website

Davis Cup Americas Zone
Americas